Brazil–São Tomé and Príncipe relations refer to the bilateral relations between Brazil and São Tomé and Príncipe. Both nations are members of the Community of Portuguese Language Countries, Group of 77 and the United Nations.

History
Both Brazil and São Tomé and Príncipe were united for three hundred years as part of the Portuguese Empire. As part of the Portuguese Empire, São Tomé and Príncipe was used as launching point during the Atlantic slave trade from continental Africa to Brazil. From 1815 to 1822, São Tomé and Príncipe was administered by Brazil during the Transfer of the Portuguese court to Brazil.

In July 1975, São Tomé and Príncipe obtained its independence from Portugal. That same year, Brazil recognized São Tomé and Príncipe's independence. In December 1975, Brazil opened an embassy office in São Tomé. In June 1984, both nations signed an Agreement on Cultural Cooperation and an Agreement on Scientific and Technical Cooperation.

In November 2003, Brazilian President Luiz Inácio Lula da Silva paid an official visit to São Tomé and Príncipe, becoming the first Brazilian head-of-state to visit the country. During his visit, President da Silva inaugurated the Brazilian embassy in São Tomé and signed cooperation agreements with projects such as Bolsa Família, family farming, literacy, education and sports. President da Silva also made the symbolic delivery of a batch of 2,592 books donated by the Brazilian Ministry of Culture to São Tomé. In 2004, São Toméan President Fradique de Menezes paid an official visit to Brazil.

In March 2008, the Center for Brazilian Studies was inaugurated in São Tomé. The Brazilian Cooperation Agency assists and develops projects in several diverse areas in São Tomé and Príncipe including infrastructure, agriculture, literacy, health and HIV/AIDS prevention.

High-level visits

High-level visits from Brazil to São Tomé and Príncipe
 President Luiz Inácio Lula da Silva (2003, 2004)
 Foreign Minister Mauro Vieira (2015)

High-level visits from São Tomé and Príncipe to Brazil

 Foreign Minister Maria do Nascimento da Graça Amorim (1984)
 Foreign Minister Alberto Paulino (2000)
 President Fradique de Menezes (2004, 2005)
 Foreign Minister Ovídio Manuel Barbosa Pequeno (2004, 2005)
 Foreign Minister Carlos Augusto dos Anjos (2007)
 Foreign Minister Carlos Tiny (2009, 2010)
 President Evaristo Carvalho (2018)

Resident diplomatic missions
 Brazil has an embassy in São Tomé.
 São Tomé and Príncipe is accredited to Brazil from its Permanent Mission to the United Nations in New York.

See also
 Lusophone Games
 United Kingdom of Portugal, Brazil and the Algarves

References 

 
Brazil
São Tomé and Príncipe